The Veterans of Foreign Wars Walter R. Mickens Post 6021 and William Weech American Legion Post 168 is an historic building in Key West, Florida. Ground was broken for it in 1951. It was primarily dedicated to serve black military personnel deployed in the Florida Keys. Some of the entertainers who performed there were Otis Redding and Etta James. On May 30, 2012, it was added to the National Register of Historic Places.

References

Buildings and structures in Key West, Florida
Landmarks in Key West, Florida
History of Key West, Florida
National Register of Historic Places in Key West, Florida
American Legion buildings
Buildings and structures completed in 1951
Veterans of Foreign Wars buildings
1951 establishments in Florida